Schistura maculiceps is a species of ray-finned fish, a stone loach, in the genus Schistura from Borneo.

References

M
Freshwater fish of Indonesia
Fish described in 1989